SS Grover C. Hutcherson was a Liberty ship built in the United States during World War II. She was named after Grover C. Hutcherson, a Merchant seaman killed on the Liberty ship  when she was
struck by an Italian Ju-87 Stuka while anchored off August Sicily, 13 July 1943.

Construction
Grover C. Hutcherson was laid down on 21 November 1944, under a Maritime Commission (MARCOM) contract, MC hull 2512, by the St. Johns River Shipbuilding Company, Jacksonville, Florida; she was sponsored by Mrs. A.J. Gollnick, the wife of the assistant general superintendent in charge of St. John's River SB, and was launched on 22 December 1944.

History
She was allocated to the Overlakes Freight Corp., on 31 December 1944. On 28 April 1948, she was laid up in the National Defense Reserve Fleet, Wilmington, North Carolina. On 28 May 1952, she was laid up in the James River Reserve Fleet, Lee Hall, Virginia. On 17 May 1954, she was withdrawn from the fleet to be loaded with grain under the "Grain Program 1954", she returned loaded on 26 May 1954. On 4 October 1956, she was withdrawn to be unload, she returned reloaded with grain on 22 October 1956. On 9 September 1963, she was withdrawn from the fleet to be unloaded, she returned empty on 26 September 1963. She was sold for scrapping, 12 September 1972, to Isaac Varela, for $80,007. She was removed from the fleet on 6 November 1972.

References

Bibliography

 
 
 
 

 

Liberty ships
Ships built in Jacksonville, Florida
1944 ships
Wilmington Reserve Fleet
James River Reserve Fleet
James River Reserve Fleet Grain Program